Rockleigh Historic District is located in Rockleigh, Bergen County, New Jersey, United States. The district was added to the National Register of Historic Places on June 29, 1977.

See also
National Register of Historic Places listings in Bergen County, New Jersey

References

Historic districts on the National Register of Historic Places in New Jersey
Geography of Bergen County, New Jersey
National Register of Historic Places in Bergen County, New Jersey
Rockleigh, New Jersey
New Jersey Register of Historic Places